Chawalit Plaphol (born 30 August 1974) is a Thai golfer.

He took up golf at the age of twelve and won team and individual gold medals for Thailand at the 1995 South East Asian Games. He turned professional in 1996 and has been a regular competitor on the Asian Tour since that year. He has won two Asian Tour events and in 2005 he achieved a career best order of merit placing of seventh. He also plays on the Japan Golf Tour, on which he was victorious in the 2004 ANA Open. He represented Thailand in the 2000 WGC-World Cup alongside his cousin Thammanoon Sriroj.

Amateur wins
1995 South East Asian Games (individual and team)

Professional wins (11)

Japan Golf Tour wins (1)

Japan Golf Tour playoff record (0–1)

Asian Tour wins (4)

Asian Tour playoff record (1–0)

All Thailand Golf Tour wins (2)
2005 Chevrolet Championship
2013 Singha All Thailand Grand Final

ASEAN PGA Tour wins (2)

Thailand PGA Tour wins (1)

Other wins (1)
1998 Hugo Boss Foursomes (China; with Jim Rutledge)

Team appearances
World Cup (representing Thailand): 2000

External links

Chawalit Plaphol
Asian Tour golfers
Japan Golf Tour golfers
Competitors at the 1995 Southeast Asian Games
Chawalit Plaphol
1974 births
Living people